The International Journal of Asian Studies is a peer-reviewed academic journal covering research in the social sciences and humanities as pertaining to Asia. The journal was established in 2004 and is published on behalf of the Institute for Advanced Studies on Asia (University of Tokyo).

The editor-in-chief is Jin Sato (University of Tokyo).

Abstracting and indexing 
The journal is abstracted and indexed in:
 Scopus
 MLA - Modern Language Association Database
 Worldwide Political Science Abstracts
 Historical Abstracts

External links 
 
 Institute for the Advanced Studies on Asia

References

Asian studies journals
Publications established in 2004
Cambridge University Press academic journals
Biannual journals
English-language journals
Academic journals associated with universities and colleges